The 2010 Cheltenham Gold Cup was a horse race which took place at Cheltenham on Friday 19 March 2010. It was the 82nd running of the Cheltenham Gold Cup, and it was won by Imperial Commander. The winner was ridden by Paddy Brennan and trained by Nigel Twiston-Davies. The pre-race favourite Kauto Star fell at fence 19.

Race details
 Sponsor: Totesport
 Winner's prize money: £270,797.50
 Going: Good (Good to Soft in places)
 Number of runners: 11
 Winner's time: 6m 43.90s

Full result

* The distances between the horses are shown in lengths or shorter. shd = short-head† Trainers are based in Great Britain unless indicated

Winner's details
Further details of the winner, Imperial Commander:

 Foaled: 21 May 2001 in Ireland
 Sire: Flemensfirth; Dam: Ballinlovane (Le Moss)
 Owner: Our Friends in the North
 Breeder: Laurence J. Flynn

References

External links
 Imperial Commander tears up the Gold Cup's two-horse script The Guardian, 19 March 2010

Cheltenham Gold Cup
 2010
2010 in British sport
2010s  in Gloucestershire
Cheltenham Gold Cup